The Autophone was an early type of organette, invented in 1878 by Henry Bishop Horton. One of the first table-top organettes to be mass-produced, it played music using punched cards to activate 22 reeds.

See also

References

External links

1878 in music
Organs (music)